These are the largest banks in the Philippines ranked by total assets as published by Bangko Sentral ng Pilipinas (BSP).

Universal and commercial banks

2022

Thrift banks

2022

Rural and cooperative banks

2022

See also
 List of banks in the Philippines
 List of largest banks in Southeast Asia
 Review of top banks in the Philippines

References

Philippines
Philippines
 
Banks